The Central Atlantic Collegiate Conference women's basketball tournament is the annual conference women's basketball championship tournament for the Central Atlantic Collegiate Conference. The tournament has been held annually since 2002. It is a single-elimination tournament and seeding is based on regular season records.

The winner receives the CACC's automatic bid to the NCAA Division II women's basketball tournament.

Holy Family have won the most tournament titles, with seven.

Results

Championship records

Bridgeport, Chestnut Hill, and Felician have not yet reached a CACC tournament final.
Concordia (NY) and NJIT never advanced to the CACC tournament finals as a conference members.
 Schools highlighted in pink are former members of the CACC.

See also
 CACC men's basketball tournament

References

NCAA Division II women's basketball conference tournaments
Basketball Tournament, Women's
Recurring sporting events established in 2002